Evald Mahl (14 April 1915 – 18 January 2001) was an Estonian basketball player. He competed in the 1936 Summer Olympics.

Mahl was born in Tartu, Estonia, the son of Peeter and Pauline (née Martin) Mahl. He began playing basketball in 1927. He was the 1934, 1936, 1937, and 1944 Estonian national basketball champion. He also competed in volleyball at the 1934 Estonian Masters and competed in baseball and athletics. During World War II, he fled Estonia for Germany. Mahl later moved to Canada before settling in the United States. He lived in Des Moines from 1951 onward. He is buried at Glendale Cemetery in Des Moines, Iowa.

References

1915 births
2001 deaths
Sportspeople from Tartu
People from the Governorate of Livonia
Estonian men's basketball players
Olympic basketball players of Estonia
Basketball players at the 1936 Summer Olympics
Estonian World War II refugees
Estonian emigrants to the United States